

Iceland
 Thorolfur Beck – Rouen – 1966–67
 Arnór Guðjohnsen – Bordeaux – 1990–91
 Eiður Guðjohnsen – AS Monaco – 2009–10
 Albert Guðmundsson – FC Nancy, RC Paris, Nice – 1947–48, 1949–53
 Veigar Páll Gunnarsson – AS Nancy – 2008–09
 Rúnar Alex Rúnarsson – Dijon – 2018–20
 Kolbeinn Sigþórsson – Nantes – 2015–18
 Karl Þórðarson – Laval – 1981–84
 Teitur Thordarson – Lens – 1981–83

Iran
 Saman Ghoddos – Amiens – 2018–21

Ireland
 John Byrne – Le Havre AC – 1988–90
 Tony Cascarino – Marseille, AS Nancy – 1996–97, 1998–2000
 Tom Davis – FC Metz – 1934–35
 Michael Kelly – Marseille – 1948–49
 Noel King – Valenciennes FC – 1982–85
 Mick McCarthy – Lyon – 1989–90
 Jacko McDonagh – Nîmes Olympique – 1985–87
 Frank Stapleton – Le Havre AC – 1988–89
 Bernard Williams – Sochaux – 1932–39, 1945–46

Israel
 Eliran Atar – Reims – 2013–15
 Tal Banin – Cannes – 1993–94
 Eden Ben Basat – Brest, Toulouse – 2011-2014
 Ronnie Calderon – Paris FC – 1973–74
 Maor Melikson – Valenciennes – 2012–14
 Vicky Peretz – Strasbourg – 1980–82
 Itay Shechter – Nantes – 2013–15
 Giora Spiegel – Strasbourg, Lyon – 1973–78
 Mordechai Spiegler – Paris FC, Paris SG – 1972–74
 Shalom Tikva – Lens – 1991–92

Italy
 Henri Alberto – Lyon, Monaco – 1954–56, 1956–61
 Gennaro Luigi Alfano – Toulon – 1983–93
 Mario Balotelli – Nice, Marseille – 2016–19
 Antonio Barreca – Monaco – 2018–19
 Cristian Battocchio – Brest – 2019–21
 Raoul Bellanova – Bordeaux – 2019–20
 Cesare Benedetti – Marseille, Toulouse FC – 1948–51
 Armando Bianchi – Paris SG – 1978–80
 Angelo Bollano – Marseille – 1948–50
 Gianluigi Buffon – Paris SG – 2018–19
 Arturo Calabresi – Amiens – 2019–20
 Aridex Calligaris – Saint-Étienne, Lyon – 1945–49, 1951–52
 Angelo Contini – Lens – 1950–51
 Elpidio Coppa – Rennes – 1948–49
 Alessandro Crescenzi – AC Ajaccio – 2013–14
 Antoine Curcuru  – Marseille – 1935–36
 Paolo De Ceglie – Marseille – 2015–16
 Morgan De Sanctis – Monaco – 2016–17
 Mattia De Sciglio – Lyon – 2020–21
 Edmondo Della Valle – Nice – 1932–34
 Marco Di Costanzo – Nice, Rennes – 1994–95, 1997–98
 Marco Di Vaio – Monaco – 2006–07
 Gianluigi Donnarumma – Paris SG – 2021–
 Stephan El Shaarawy – Monaco – 2015–16
 Emerson – Lyon – 2021–22
 Felica Farina – Sedan – 1958–59
 Paolo Farina – Bastia – 1968–71
 Marcello Farrabi – Sedan – 1972–74
 Emilio Ferlatti – Béziers – 1957–58
 Alessandro Florenzi – Paris SG – 2020–21
 Ivan Franceschini – Marseille – 1996–97
 Dante Gentini – Nice – 1956–57
 Corrado Grossi – Marseille – 1948–49
 Fabio Grosso – Lyon – 2007–10
 Moise Kean – Paris SG – 2020–21
 Pietro Landi – RC Paris, Nice, Troyes – 1949–53, 1954–56
 Luigi Lavecchia – Le Mans – 2005–06
 Dante Lerda – Cannes – 1938–39, 1945–49
 Alberto Malusci – Marseille – 1996–97
 Vito Mannone – Monaco, Lorient – 2020–
 Renato Marchiaro – Nice – 1948–49 (or Alès)
 Pietro Migliaccio – Marseille – 1946–47
 Alberto Molina – Montpellier – 1952–53
 Stelvio Molinari – Nice – 1949–50
 Thiago Motta – Paris SG – 2011–18
 Roberto Onorati – Nice – 1996–97
 Joseph Dayo Oshadogan – Monaco – 2003–05
 Michele Padovano – Metz – 1999–2000
 Christian Panucci – Monaco – 2000–02
 Pietro Pellegri – Monaco – 2017–19, 2020–21
 Alberto Poli – Angers, Paris SG, Rouen – 1965–68, 1969–75, 1977–78
 Ovilio Pratesi – Monaco – 1953–56
 Andrea Raggi – Monaco – 2013–19
 Fabrizio Ravanelli – Marseille – 1997–2000
 Francesco Rier – Nice – 1932–34
 Flavio Roma – Monaco – 2001–09
 Daniele Rugani – Rennes – 2020–21
 Ernesto Sandroni – Rennes – 1951–52
 Nello Sbaiz – Saint-Étienne – 1959–67
 Alfredo Scapinello – Le Havre – 1961–62
 Antonio Scavarini – Marseille – 1948–52
 Roberto Serone – Nice – 1949–51
 Marco Simone – Paris SG, Monaco, Nice – 1997–2001, 2003–04
 Salvatore Sirigu – Paris SG – 2011–16
 Alfredo Spadavecchia – Saint-Étienne – 1952–53
 Ernesto Tomasi – Nice, Cannes – 1932–33, 1946–47
 Denis Tonucci – AC Ajaccio – 2013–14
 Stefano Torrisi – Marseille – 2001–02
 Primo Vecchies – Stade Français – 1946–47, 1948–49
 Giuseppe Verk – SC Nîmes – 1932–33
 Marco Verratti – Paris SG – 2012–
 Christian Vieri – Monaco – 2005–06
 Mattia Viti – Nice – 2022–
 Aldo Vollono – Antibes – 1933–34

References and notes

Books

Club pages
AJ Auxerre former players
AJ Auxerre former players
Girondins de Bordeaux former players
Girondins de Bordeaux former players
Les ex-Tangos (joueurs), Stade Lavallois former players
Olympique Lyonnais former players
Olympique de Marseille former players
FC Metz former players
AS Monaco FC former players
Ils ont porté les couleurs de la Paillade... Montpellier HSC Former players
AS Nancy former players
FC Nantes former players
Paris SG former players
Red Star Former players
Red Star former players
Stade de Reims former players
Stade Rennais former players
CO Roubaix-Tourcoing former players
AS Saint-Étienne former players
Sporting Toulon Var former players

Others

stat2foot
footballenfrance
French Clubs' Players in European Cups 1955-1995, RSSSF
Finnish players abroad, RSSSF
Italian players abroad, RSSSF
Romanians who played in foreign championships
Swiss players in France, RSSSF
EURO 2008 CONNECTIONS: FRANCE, Stephen Byrne Bristol Rovers official site

Notes

France
 
Association football player non-biographical articles